La Mulatière is a commune in the Metropolis of Lyon in Auvergne-Rhône-Alpes region in eastern France.

The city is known, among other things, for its Aquarium du Grand Lyon.

Population

See also
Communes of the Metropolis of Lyon

References

Communes of Lyon Metropolis
Lyonnais